This article describes the qualification for the 2021 Women's European Volleyball Championship.

Qualifying matches were initially scheduled in August and September 2020 but due to COVID-19 pandemic CEV decided to postpone the matches. On 29 June 2020, CEV released a tentative schedule moving the matches to January 2021.

In December 2020 as a response to the coronavirus crisis and the many restrictions in place in many countries for teams to travel and organisers to host and deliver sporting events, the CEV Board of Administration has decided to postpone the completion of the CEV EuroVolley 2021 qualifiers to 16 May 2021 at the latest.

Qualification
Serbia, Bulgaria, Croatia and Romania as host countries were directly qualified. The eight best placed teams at the 2019 edition also gained direct entries into the tournament. 23 teams compete for the remaining 12 places at the final tournament.

Direct qualification
 2019 Women's European Volleyball Championship final standing

Format
There being six pools of either three or four teams each, the top two of each pool will qualify for the 2021 European Championship. The pools will be played in a double round-robin tournaments format officially from 7 to 16 May 2021.

Pools composition
The pools were set following the Serpentine system according to their European Ranking for national teams as of January 2020. Due to travel restrictions in place for citizens of Kosovo, their team has been moved to the next available pool where no such restrictions would apply. Rankings are shown in brackets.

Pool standing procedure
 Number of matches won
 Match points
 Sets ratio
 Points ratio
 If the tie continues as per the point ratio between two teams, the priority will be given to the team which won the last match between them. When the tie in points ratio is between three or more teams, a new classification of these teams in the terms of points 1, 2 and 3 will be made taking into consideration only the matches in which they were opposed to each other.

Match won 3–0 or 3–1: 3 match points for the winner, 0 match points for the loser
Match won 3–2: 2 match points for the winner, 1 match point for the loser

Results

Pool A

|}

Venue:  Čyžoŭka-Arena, Team Sports Hall, Minsk, Belarus

|}

Pool B

|}

Tournament 1
Venue:  Centro de Deportos e Congressos de Matosinhos, Matosinhos, Portugal

|}

Tournament 2
Venue:  New Volleyball Arena, Tbilisi, Georgia

|}

Pool C

|}

Tournament 1
Venue:  Larissa Neapolis Indoor Arena, Larissa, Greece

|}

Tournament 2
Venue:  Raiffeisen Sportpark, Graz, Austria

|}

Pool D

|}

Tournament 1
Venue:  SC Verde Hall, Podgorica, Montenegro
All times are Central European Summer Time (UTC+02:00).

|}

Tournament 2
Venue:  Nitra City Hall, Nitra, Slovakia
All times are Central European Summer Time (UTC+02:00).

|}

Pool E

|}

Tournament 1
Venue:  Le Phare, Belfort, France

|}

Tournament 2
Venue:  Ludovika Arena, Budapest, Hungary

|}

Pool F

|}

Tournament 1
Venue:  Daugavpils Olympic Centre, Daugavpils, Latvia

|}

Tournament 2
Venue:  Gradska Arena "Husejin Smajlović", Zenica, Bosnia and Herzegovina

|}

References

External links
Official website 

2021
2020 in women's volleyball
2021 in women's volleyball
Qualification for volleyball competitions
European Volleyball Championship qualification, 2021 Women's